Þorvaldur Davíð Kristjánsson, also known as Thor Kristjansson (born 27 September 1983) is an Icelandic actor and singer.

Biography
Þorvaldur was born in Reykjavík, and first found fame as the voice of Simba in the Icelandic language version of Disney’s Lion King. Subsequent voiceovers include appearances in Toy Story and Happy Feet. Þorvaldur has performed in many of Iceland's most renowned theaters, including The Icelandic National Theater and Reykjavik City Theater. He moved to New York in 2007 to pursue a BFA in The Juilliard School’s Drama Division, where he graduated in 2011 as a member of Group 40. His education was fully funded by scholarships and through the personal assistance of the Academy Award winner and former Juilliard alumni Robin Williams.

Þorvaldur had his first leading role, in the feature film Svartur á leik (English: Black's game), a year after his graduation from The Juilliard School. When Black's Game opened in Iceland it became the biggest box office hit in 2012 and the 2nd-highest-grossing Icelandic movie in history.

Þorvaldur's first Hollywood studio film was Dracula Untold, produced by Universal Pictures, Legendary Pictures and Michael De Luca. It was directed by Gary Shore and starred Luke Evans, Dominic Cooper, Sarah Gadon and Samantha Barks. Þorvaldur played Bright Eyes, an Eastern European taken as a slave as a young boy who became a vicious assassin in the Ottoman Army.

Filmography
 Reykjavik Whale Watching Massacre (2009)
 Svartur á leik (2012)
 Dracula Untold (2014)
 Life in a Fishbowl (2014)
 I Remember You (2017)
 The Swan (2017)
 White Lines (2020)
 The Minister (2020)
 Yes-People  (2021)
 Reply to a Letter from Helga (2022)

References

External links

Living people
Juilliard School alumni
Icelandic male child actors
Icelandic male voice actors
Icelandic male stage actors
Icelandic male film actors
21st-century Icelandic male actors
Male actors from Reykjavík
1983 births